The Purple Earth hypothesis is an astrobiological hypothesis that photosynthetic life forms of early Earth were based on the simpler molecule retinal rather than the more complex chlorophyll, making Earth appear purple rather than green. An example of retinal-based organisms that exist today are the photosynthetic microbes collectively called Haloarchaea. That time would date somewhere between 2.4 and 3.5 billion years ago, prior to the Great Oxygenation Event. Many Haloarchaea contain the retinal protein, bacteriorhodopsin, in their purple membrane which carries out light-driven proton pumping, generating a proton-motive gradient across the cell membrane and driving ATP synthesis. The haloarchaeal purple membrane constitutes one of the simplest known bioenergetic systems for harvesting light energy.

Retinal-containing purple membrane exhibits a single light absorption peak centered in the green-yellow energy-rich region of the solar spectrum, but allows transmission of red and blue light, resulting in a deep purple color. Chlorophyll pigments, in contrast, absorb red and blue light, but little or no green light, which results in the characteristic green color of plants, cyanobacteria, and photosynthetic membranes. Microorganisms with purple and green pigments frequently co-exist in stratified communities where they may utilize complementary regions of the solar spectrum.

The simplicity of haloarchaeal retinal pigments in comparison to the more complex chlorophyll-based photosynthetic membrane, their association with isoprenoid lipids in the cell membrane, as well as the discovery of archaeal membrane components in ancient sediments on the early Earth are consistent with an early appearance of life forms with purple membrane prior to green photosynthesis. 

Co-existence of purple and green pigment containing microorganisms in many environments suggests their co-evolution. Astrobiologists have suggested that retinal pigments may serve as remote biosignatures in exoplanet research.

This hypothesis has great implications on the search for living organisms on other planets. Historically we would search for planets that we expected to have chlorophyll which absorbs the blue and red wavelengths of the sun. This means planets that reflect less red light are more likely to have living organisms. The Purple Earth hypothesis suggests that there are other methods for living organisms to convert light into energy and therefore we should expand our search and look for purple planets as well as green ones.

See also 
Bacteriorhodopsin – A proton pump used by Haloarchaea to harvest light energy.
 Microbial rhodopsin

References

External links 
Colorful Worlds: Plants on Other Planets Might Not Be Green
PBS Eons: When the Earth was purple
CNN Colorscope-When life on Earth began, it was purple

Astrobiology